The Woman's Community Club Band Shell is a historic open-air band shell in Spring Park, a public park in downtown Heber Springs, Arkansas.  It is a roughly rectangular structure, built out of local fieldstone, with the main half-dome shell formed out of concrete.  The sides of the shell are articulated by pilasters, which also appear at the building corners.  The rear of the building is enclosed, provide dressing room space for performers.  The shell was built in 1933, replacing an older wood-frame performance pavilion.

The band shell was listed on the National Register of Historic Places in 1994.

See also
National Register of Historic Places listings in Cleburne County, Arkansas

References

Band shells
Event venues on the National Register of Historic Places in Arkansas
Event venues established in 1933
Individually listed contributing properties to historic districts on the National Register in Arkansas
1933 establishments in Arkansas
Rustic architecture in Arkansas
History of women in Arkansas